Vabre-Tizac (Languedocien: Vabre e Tisac) is a former commune in the Aveyron department in the Occitanie region in southern France. On 1 January 2016, it was merged into the new commune of Le Bas Ségala.

Population

See also
Communes of the Aveyron department

References

Former communes of Aveyron
Aveyron communes articles needing translation from French Wikipedia
Populated places disestablished in 2016